Learning to Drive may refer to:

 Learning to Drive (film), a 2014 film
 "Learning to Drive" (song), song by Scott Weiland